Ludovico II may refer to:

 Ludovico II Gonzaga, capitano del popolo of Mantua (1334-1382)
 Ludovico II Gonzaga, Marquis of Mantua (1412–1478)
 Ludovico II of Saluzzo (1438-1504)